Across the Sea may refer to:

 "Across the Sea" (Lost), an episode of the television series Lost
 "Across the Sea", a song by Weezer from the album Pinkerton